FC Séquence de Dixinn is an association football club from Guinea based in Dixinn. They play their home games at 35,000 capacity Stade du 28 Septembre.

Achievements
Guinée Coupe Nationale: 3
Winner: 2010, 2011, 2012

Guinée Super Coupe: 1
Winner: 2010

Performance in CAF competitions
CAF Confederation Cup: 2 appearances
2011 – Preliminary round
2012 – First Round

Current Players

Football clubs in Guinea

References